Sweet Love, Bitter may refer to:

 Sweet Love, Bitter (album)
 Sweet Love, Bitter (film)